Kamounia, sometimes spelled Kamouneya, is a beef and liver stew prepared with cumin. It is a part of Sudanese cuisine and Tunisian cuisine. Lamb is also sometimes used as a primary ingredient, and additional spices are sometimes used. It is sometimes served with or atop cooked rice. Additional basic ingredients can include broth, garlic, olive oil and parsley.

See also
 List of African dishes
 List of stews
 Maghreb cuisine

References

Arab cuisine
African soups
Beef dishes
Lamb dishes
Liver (food)
Egyptian cuisine
Tunisian cuisine